Caysar Adiljan (born 3 June 1999) is a Chinese footballer currently playing as a midfielder for Suzhou Dongwu F.C..

Career statistics

Club
.

References

1999 births
Living people
People from Ürümqi
Footballers from Xinjiang
Chinese footballers
Association football midfielders
China League Two players
China League One players
Beijing Guoan F.C. players
Hubei Istar F.C. players
Wuhan Three Towns F.C. players